Leszczyny  is a village in the administrative district of Gmina Biały Dunajec, within Tatra County, Lesser Poland Voivodeship, in southern Poland.

The village has a population of 290.

References

Leszczyny